Iguanodectinae is a subfamily of small freshwater fish in the family Iguanodectidae. They are most prominently found in the Amazon river basin and its major tributaries, but they are also known from the Tocantins, Orinoco, and Paraguay rivers. It has two genera, Piabucus and Iguanodectes. Some species in the subfamily are taken from the wild for aquariums, like the red- and green-line lizard tetras (Iguanodectes geisleri and Iguanodectes spilurus, respectively). There is minor, but ongoing, debate regarding its taxonomy.

Description 
Members of Iguanodectinae are generally fairly small, none more than 13 cm in length. Members of Piabucus are slightly larger than members of Iguanodectes, reaching a maximum of 12.9 cm (5.1 in), while members of Iguanodectes only reach 10.3 cm (4.1 in). They are slender and rather elongate in body shape, comparable to minnows; ichthyologist Carl H. Eigenmann, who named the subfamily, likened them to smelt. Their scales are often brightly colored or reflective, and this, combined with their small size, makes them a potential target for the aquarium industry. 

The dorsal fin is located behind the middle of the body and usually behind the start of the pelvic fin, though sometimes the dorsal and pelvic fins are on the same line of origin. All members of the subfamily have a small dorsal adipose fin. Piabucus typically have longer pectoral fins and a deeper chest than Iguanodectes (sometimes described as a more pronounced "pectoral keel"). The lateral line is complete in all species. The species Iguanodectes geisleri has some morphological differences when compared to its congeners; its dorsal fin originates in the middle of the body, as opposed to behind the middle, and its anal fin is shorter in length. 

The mouth is small, terminal, and does not extend past or under the eye. The maxilla is equipped with multicuspid incisor teeth, contracted at the base and flaring outwards. The premaxilla has one or two teeth on each side in all species, except for Piabucus melanostomus, which lacks this "outer set". This dentition is primarily used for an herbivorous diet, at least in Iguanodectes, but little is known of the subfamily's ecology outside of this.

Taxonomy 

When first classified in 1909 by ichthyologist Carl H. Eigenmann, Iguanodectinae was placed in the family Characidae; at the time, it had a sole representative in the genus Iguanodectes. By 1929, this definition had expanded to include Piabucus. In 1954, James Erwin Böhlke confirmed by way of morphology that Iguanodectes and Piabucus should both be in Iguanodectinae. The monophyly of the subfamily was noted by Richard P. Vari in research from the year 1977. Research by Oliviera et al., based both in phylogeny and morphology, prompted a move to the family Iguanodectidae from Characidae in 2011; this move was also done to keep Characidae monophyletic. The same research also moved the monogeneric Bryconops clade into Iguanodectidae, leaving Iguanodectinae and Bryconops as the only two taxa therein.

While Iguanodectinae is recognized by sources like OBIS and the World Register of Marine Species, other sources such as NCBI and the Interim Register of Marine and Nonmarine Genera consider it synonymous with Iguanodectidae. Eschmeyer's Catalog of Fishes and GBIF simply don't acknowledge it, uniting the genera therein. ITIS still considers it synonymous with Characidae.

Iguanodectes is the more speciose of the two genera, with 8 members. Piabucus has 3. 

Iguanodectes (Cope, 1982)

 Iguanodectes adujai (Géry, 1970)
 Iguanodectes geisleri (Géry, 1970)
 Iguanodectes gracilis (Géry, 1993)
 Iguanodectes polylepis (Géry, 1993)
 Iguanodectes purusii (Steindachner, 1908)
 Iguanodectes rachovii (Regan, 1912)
 Iguanodectes spilurus (Günther, 1864)
 Iguanodectes variatus (Géry, 1993)

Piabucus (Oken, 1817)

 Piabucus caudomaculatus (Vari, 1977)
 Piabucus dentatus (Kölreuter, 1763)
 Piabucus melanostoma (Holmberg, 1891)

Habitat 
All members of Iguanodectinae from both genera reside in South America. They can be found in the Amazon, Orinoco, Tocantins, and Paraguay rivers, as well as all major tributaries of the Amazon. Of these, the Paraguay is the least-populated; Iguanodectinae is only represented therein by a few species in the genus Piabucus. When in captivity, species from both genera have been observed to be intolerant of poor water conditions, demonstrating a preference for a well-oxygenated environment. They seem to prefer swimming near the surface of the water.

Etymology 
The subfamily Iguanodectinae gets its name from the genus Iguanodectes, which used to be its sole representative. Carl H. Eigenmann noted in 1929 that the root allusion was not made clear in the original materials for Iguanodectes; modern consensus, however, agrees with the analysis he subsequently provided, that it originates in "iguana", the lizard, and the Greek word "dectes", which means "to bite" or "to devour". Drawing from this, the common name "lizard bite tetra" for the entire family Iguanodectidae has been proposed, but has not been accepted. The subfamily Iguanodectinae also has no accepted common name.

In Aquaria 

Though not as popular as many other species of tetra, several members of Iguanodectinae are seen in the aquarium trade. Piabucus dentatus, sometimes called the Piabuco tetra, is taken from the wild for such purposes, but is not at risk of going extinct from it. Reports from hobbyists as recently as "the summer of 2018" show that such collection is still ongoing. It tends to form groups, so aquarists are recommended to house as many as at least 6 at a time. This goes for the other species of Piabucus as well; all three are sometimes grouped as Piabucus sp. and called "chin tetras". This is likely due to distinct markings on the lower jaw.

Fish from Iguanodectes are slightly more common than from Piabucus, but are still infrequent in the trade. I. geisleri is sold under the name "red line lizard tetra", and I. spilurus has the name "green line lizard tetra". I. adujai looks quite similar to I. geisleri, so is sometimes part of the same stock.

References 

Characiformes